The Spring Lake Heights School District is a community public school district that serves students in kindergarten through eighth grade from Spring Lake Heights, in Monmouth County, New Jersey, United States.

As of the 2018–19 school year, the district, comprised of one school, had an enrollment of 336 students and 34.5 classroom teachers (on an FTE basis), for a student–teacher ratio of 9.7:1.

The district is classified by the New Jersey Department of Education as being in District Factor Group "FG", the fourth-highest of eight groupings. District Factor Groups organize districts statewide to allow comparison by common socioeconomic characteristics of the local districts. From lowest socioeconomic status to highest, the categories are A, B, CD, DE, FG, GH, I and J.

Public school students in ninth through twelfth grades attend Manasquan High School in Manasquan, as part of a sending/receiving relationship with the Manasquan Public Schools. Manasquan High School also serves students from Avon-by-the-Sea, Belmar, Brielle, Lake Como, Sea Girt and Spring Lake, who attend Manasquan High School as part of sending/receiving relationships with their respective districts. As of the 2018–19 school year, the high school had an enrollment of 969 students and 72.9 classroom teachers (on an FTE basis), for a student–teacher ratio of 13.3:1.

Awards and recognition
Spring Lake Heights School was recognized by Governor Jim McGreevey in 2003 as one of 25 schools selected statewide for the First Annual Governor's School of Excellence award.

School
Spring Lake Heights School had an enrollment of 327 students in grades K-8 as of the 2018–19 school year. The school was built in 1938.
John W. Spalthoff, Principal

Administration
Core members of the district's administration are:
John W. Spalthoff, Superintendent
Matthew K. Varley, Business Administrator / Board Secretary

Board of education
The district's board of education, comprised of five members, sets policy and oversees the fiscal and educational operation of the district through its administration. As a Type II school district, the board's trustees are elected directly by voters to serve three-year terms of office on a staggered basis, with either one or two seats up for election each year held (since 2012) as part of the November general election. The board appoints a superintendent to oversee the day-to-day operation of the district.

References

External links
Spring Lake Heights School District

School Data for the Spring Lake Heights School District, National Center for Education Statistics

Spring Lake Heights, New Jersey
New Jersey District Factor Group FG
School districts in Monmouth County, New Jersey
Public K–8 schools in New Jersey